Draga is a small settlement next to Dornberk in the Municipality of Nova Gorica in western Slovenia. It is located in the Vipava Valley in the Gorizia region.

Name
The name Draga is derived from the Slovene common noun draga 'small, narrow valley', referring to the geographical location of the settlement.

References

External links
Draga on Geopedia

Populated places in the City Municipality of Nova Gorica